Southern Cemetery may refer to:

Asia
In Israel
The Southern Cemetery is one of the ancient funerary sites in Achziv, Israel

Europe
In Germany
Alter Südfriedhof (Old Southern Cemetery), Munich
Südfriedhof (Cologne)
Südfriedhof (Leipzig)

In the Netherlands
Zuiderbegraafplaats (Southern Cemetery), Groningen

In Romania
Southern Cemetery (Focşani)

In Russia
Southern Cemetery, Saint Petersburg

In the United Kingdom
Southern Cemetery, Manchester
Southern Cemetery, Nottingham

Oceania
In New Zealand
Dunedin Southern Cemetery